Mutya ng Pilipinas 2012, the 44th edition of Mutya ng Pilipinas, Inc., was held on August 12, 2012 at the UP Theater in Diliman, Quezon City. Camille Guevarra, the winner of Mutya ng Pilipinas Asia Pacific (Intercontinental) who competed at Miss Intercontinental Pageant on Nov. 23 in Aachen, Germany and Rizzini Alexis Gomez named as Mutya ng Pilipinas Tourism who later was crowned Miss Tourism International 2012/2013 in Kuala Lumpur, Malaysia on Dec. 31, 2012.

Results
Color keys

Special Title

Special Awards

Contestants

Crossovers from Major National Pageants prior to this date
 Mutya #25 Rizzini Alexis Gomez was Miss World Philippines 2012 candidate
 Mutya #28 Larah Grace Lacap  was Miss World Philippines 2012 candidate

Post-Pageant Notes

 Mutya ng Pilipinas Asia Pacific (Intercontinental), Camille Guevarra competed at Miss Intercontinental 2012 in Aachen, Germany but was unplaced
 Mutya ng Pilipinas Tourism, Rizzini Alexis Gomez competed at Miss Tourism International 2012-2013 pageant in Kuala Lumpur, Malaysia and became the eventual winner of Miss Tourism International 2012/2013
 Mutya #17, Mutya Datul went on to compete at Binibining Pilipinas 2013 and won the Binibining Pilipinas-Supranational title. She eventually won the title of Miss Supranational 2013 in Minsk, Belarus becoming the first Filipina and Asian winner of the pageant.

References

External links
 Official Mutya ng Pilipinas website
  Mutya ng Pilipinas 2012 is on!

2012
2012 beauty pageants
2012 in the Philippines